The  is an organisation, established in 1938, to promote Japanese literature.

It organises five literary prizes:
Akutagawa Prize
Kikuchi Kan Prize
Matsumoto Prize
Naoki Prize
Ohya Prize

External links 
 

Japanese literature
Organizations established in 1938